Marianne Seydel (born 1 April 1950) is a retired East German swimmer. She competed in the 200 m and 400 m individual medley at the 1968 Summer Olympics and finished sixth in both events.

References

1950 births
Living people
People from Greiz
German female swimmers
Olympic swimmers of East Germany
Swimmers at the 1968 Summer Olympics
East German female medley swimmers
Sportspeople from Thuringia